Springdale Sr. Sec School is situated in Cinnamara, Jorhat, Assam, India. The school was established by Dr. Shahnaz Ahmed (former principal) in 1991. The school is run by Springdale Educational Trust and is affiliated to the Central Board of Secondary Education, New Delhi.

School buildings and playgrounds

In 2011, the school had a second school building constructed at Cinnamara, Jorhat near Sardar Ali on land of three acres.

Academic achievements

In the HSLC results of 2011 a student got All-Assam 18th rank and becomes the first top ranker of the school.

Awards and activities
The school won the 2008 Assam inter-school Bihu Utsav dance competition and came second in 2009.

In 2011 in the quiz competition held at Jorhat Engineering College two students of class VIII received second position amongst all the schools of Jorhat. The school won first in a patriotic singing competition in the same year. Spring Dale is the champion of inter-school cricket. A student won Man Of the Series for his performance in the tournament.

A student of class VII (as of 2010) is a dancer and has won awards at national level. Two students are karate experts who have won awards at international level.

In 2017, the school bagged the award for the Most Promising CBSE School in Jorhat at an event called ‘the Brands & Leaders of Tomorrow Awards 2017’ in Delhi.

References

External links

Educational institutions established in 1991
Education in Jorhat district
High schools and secondary schools in Assam
1991 establishments in Assam